Congress (A) was a political party founded by A. K. Antony when he split from the Indian National Congress (U) a splinter group of the Indian National Congress. The party was primarily active in Kerala. The party merged with the Congress (I) in 1982.

See also
List of Indian National Congress breakaway parties

External links
 https://web.archive.org/web/20060805205314/http://www.kerala.gov.in/knowkerala/political.htm

Defunct political parties in Kerala
Indian National Congress breakaway groups
1979 establishments in Kerala
1982 disestablishments in India
Political parties established in 1979
Political parties disestablished in 1982